Suranga Nanayakkara (born 1981) is a Sri Lankan born computer scientist and inventor. , he is the director of Augmented Human Lab and associate professor at the National University of Singapore. Before moving to Auckland in 2018, he was an assistant professor at Singapore University of Technology and Design. He is best known for his work on FingerReader
and Haptic Chair. His research interests include Wearable Computing, Assistive Technology, Ubiquitous computing, AI,  Collective intelligence and Robotics. MIT Technology Review honored Nanayakkara as one of the Innovators Under 35 for Asia Pacific Region 2014.

Education and research 

Suranga is from Piliyandala, in Colombo District, Sri Lanka. Having received his secondary education from Royal College, Colombo,
he completed bachelor's degree in electrical and computer engineering from the National University of Singapore in Singapore. He holds a PhD in Engineering from  National University of Singapore. Suranga spent half a year at University of Birmingham and  half a year at University of Southern California under student exchange program. Later he was a postdoctoral researcher with Pattie Maes's Fluid Interfaces Group at  MIT Media Lab.

Career 

 Since 2011, he has been directing the Augmented Human Lab.
 In 2018, he was invited to join University of Auckland as the first appointee of New Zealand Government's strategic entrepreneurial universities scheme 
 He joined Singapore University of Technology and Design as an Assistant Professor in 2011

Inventions 

Suranga is best known for his work 
EyeRing - A finger-worn interface for seamless interactions
 
Haptic Chair - Audio visual system to provide a more satisfying musical experience to deaf people 
and StickEars – a sound-based sticky note like device to make everyday objects more accessible.
Among some of his other work, Suranga has invented  SPARSH – a way to copy-paste data between digital devices; FingerDraw - way to extract colours and textures from nature and bring them into digital drawings.

Awards and achievements 

 INK Fellow, 2016, by INK
 Ten Outstanding Young Persons (TOYP), Sri Lanka award 2015, by JCI Sri Lanka 
 Young Innovator under 35 (MIT TR35) 2014 award, Asia Pacific region.
 Finalist, Singapore Challenge, Global Young Scientist Summit (GYSS’14).
 Interactive installation, iSwarm, selected for i Light Singapore 2014 Light show

References

External links 

Documentary about Suranga in a Global Vision TV, Japan
Suranga Nanayakkara's work on Yahoo News
Creating the next generation of innovators
Suranga Nanayakkara at TR35 Singapore

Human–computer interaction researchers
Computer scientists
National University of Singapore alumni
1981 births
Augmented reality
Sri Lankan emigrants to Singapore
Massachusetts Institute of Technology alumni
Living people
MIT Media Lab people